Sarala Birla University (SBU) is a private university located in the Birla Knowledge City in the Ara, about  from Ranchi on the Ranchi-Purulia highway, in the Namkum block of Ranchi, Jharkhand, India. The university was established by Bharat Arogya and Gyan Mandir through the Sarla Birla University Act, 2017 which was passed by the Jharkhand Legislative Assembly on 3 February 2017 following a letter of intent in November 2016. It is named after Sarala Birla.

See also
Education in India
List of private universities in India
List of institutions of higher education in Jharkhand

References

External links
 

Ranchi district
Universities in Jharkhand
Private universities in India
2017 establishments in Jharkhand
Educational institutions established in 2017